A special election for the Brazilian Senate in Mato Grosso took place on 15 November 2020, to fill a vacancy in the Federal Senate through the end of the term ending on 1 February 2027, arising from the expelling of Selma Arruda from the upper house after a trial in the Superior Electoral Court.

History
On 10 December 2019, the Superior Electoral Court considered valid the repeal of senator Selma Arruda term, along with her substitutes, elect in 2018. The former judge was accused of omitting expenses of R$ 1.2 million (US$ , as of 2018) in her electoral campaign to fill one of the two seats available and represent the state of Mato Grosso in the Senate, configuring supposed slush funds and abuse of economic power. It is necessary a bureaucratic act from the Senate Director Board to fulfill this decision. Selma Arruda could appeal to the Supreme Federal Court, but the appeal, at first, cannot suspend the TSE decision.

After the night of 12 March 2020, all the 12 candidacies were published and registered in the Regional Electoral Court of Mato Grosso.

Senator Selma was officially removed from the Senate on 15 April 2020. The 3rd place of the 2018 Senate election, Cárlos Favaro (PSD), temporarily took office as Senator. The election was postponed due to the COVID-19 pandemic in Brazil.

Electoral process
The election was disputed in a single round, with the most voted declared the winner of the election, regardless the vote percentage.

Candidates

Opinion polls

Results

References

2020 in Brazil
Special elections in Brazil
2020 elections in Brazil
Mato Grosso
November 2020 events in Brazil